Edward Carey Walker (July 4, 1820 – December 28, 1894) was a politician from the U. S. state of Michigan.

Biography
Walker was born to Stephen and Lydia (Gardner) Walker in Butternuts, New York, and prepared for college at Hamilton Academy. At the age of fifteen, he left his studies and joined an engineering corps engaged in building the Chenango Canal, under the charge of William J. McAlpine. After two years' service he suffered a broken knee when thrown from a carriage, which prevented him from continuing his profession.  He later studied at a branch of the University of Michigan then at Detroit, became Chaplain in the United States Army and in 1840 studied at Yale, graduating in 1842.

Walker returned to Detroit, taught school at the university and then began the study of law in the office of Joy & Parker.  He then studied for a year under Judge Story at Harvard and was admitted to the bar in 1845.  He returned to Detroit to practice law and in 1850 practiced with his brother Charles I. Walker under C. I. & E. C. Walker.  On June 16, 1852, he married Lucy Bryant of Buffalo, New York and they had two children, Bryant and Jessie.  In 1854, he was present in Jackson, Michigan, when the Republican Party was formed.  In 1857, when his brother retired, he was then associated with Charles A. Kent for fifteen years under the name of Walker & Kent in 1862.  Then he practiced with his only son, Bryant, under the name Walker & Walker.  He was also, for many years, member and Secretary of the Board of Education of Detroit.

Walker served as Chairman of the Republican State Central Committee from 1861-62.  In 1863, he was elected to serve as regent of the University of Michigan being re-elected twice.  Also in 1863, during the American Civil War, he was very charitable towards the Union cause, serving as Chairman of the Michigan Branch of the United States Christian Commission which sent delegate to the hospitals and fields.  He also served in the Michigan House of Representatives in 1867 as Chairman of the Judiciary Committee.

E. C. Walker continued to practice law until his death in 1894.  His son resumed the practice under Walker & Spalding.

The attribution of the song "I like cigars beneath the stars" by an "E. C. Walker" to the poem by Ella Wheeler Wilcox to the politician is probably mistaken.

References

Additional sources 

1820 births
1894 deaths
Harvard University alumni
Republican Party members of the Michigan House of Representatives
Regents of the University of Michigan
United States Army chaplains
People from Butternuts, New York
Michigan Republican Party chairs
University of Michigan alumni
19th-century American politicians
19th-century American clergy